Colonel Victor Milward (29 September 1840 – 31 May 1901) was a Conservative Party politician in the United Kingdom.

He was elected for the constituency of Stratford-on-Avon in 1895, and held the seat until his death in 1901.

References
Reference to Victor Milward papers in Worcestershire Record Office

External links 
 

1840 births
1901 deaths
Conservative Party (UK) MPs for English constituencies
UK MPs 1895–1900
UK MPs 1900–1906